Kirklevington (also known as Kirk Leavington) is a village in the borough of Stockton-on-Tees, North Yorkshire, England. At the 2011 census, the village had a population of 809.

The civil parish had a population of 1,361. The village shares it with Castle Levington and is situated south of Yarm, it hosts  station.

History
As an ancient parish, it included the townships of Castlelevington, Picton and Low Worsall, which became established as separate parishes in 1866. It formed part of the Stokesley Rural District from 1894 to 1974, when it became part of the borough of Stockton. The village was once home to the Kirklevington Country Club.

Pieces from the Viking crosses, dating from 10th century, found in Kirklevington, which may have been the centre of a large Anglo-Saxon estate, are on display at Preston Hall Museum in Stockton-on-Tees. Later it was a planned two row green village. Traces of four fields of ridge and furrow marking the possible site of a deserted medieval village are to be found at Red Hall Farm. The local names of "Castle Hill" & "Castle Levington" refer to a "castle" on the banks of the River Tees 1.25 miles ENE of the village but still in the parish of Kirklevington.

Geography
The unusually dispersed village is relatively modern. It includes a church, village hall, a small public park, a primary school, a riding centre at Town End Farm, Vidgen's engineering garage, and  a pub, the Crown Hotel. The population is around 800. In July 2017 Stockton Borough Council said that it "is minded " to approve a proposal to build 145 new houses in the village, which would increase the population by about one third.

Kirklevington Hall

Kirklevington Hall, about 0.75 miles north of the village, is the location of  "Judges Country House Hotel", an AA 3 Red Star Country House with 3 Rosettes. From 1881 the Hall was a family home of the Richardsons of Hartlepool. During the Second World War it was a secret command centre for the North-East. In the 1970s and 1980s it was home to the country's Judges when on  circuit to Middlesbrough courts, which is the origin of its name.
As of today,(March 2023) it has closed down, and is in the process of being sold.

Kirklevington Grange
On the southern edge of the built up area of Yarm, and about 1.5 miles north of the village, is HMP Kirklevington Grange, a men's resettlement prison for inmates intending to settle (on release) in the North East of England.

Kirklevington Country Club

The village was once home to the famous Kirklevington Country Club, 'The Kirk'.

Governance

Parliament
Kirklevington, as part of the Stockton South Parliamentary Constituency,  was represented in the House of Commons by James Wharton (Conservative), who was elected on 6 May 2010. James Wharton was re-elected with an increased majority on 7 May 2015. In August 2016 he was appointed Parliamentary Under-Secretary of State at the Department for International Development. As a result of the elections on 8 June 2017 Labour's Paul Williams, a local doctor, took over from James Wharton. In 2019, Conservative Matt Vickers won the seat.

Borough
Kirklevington is part of the Stockton-on-Tees Borough's Yarm ward, represented by three councillors. These councillors were elected as Conservatives on 6 May 2011, Mark Anthony Chatburn later defected to UKIP.

Parish
The Kirklevington and Castle Leavington Parish Council has seven members. It was chaired by Kate Brown for 7 years, however is now chaired by Jennie Beaumont who took her place in May 2017

Police
Kirklevington falls within the Cleveland Police area. As of April 2014 the police have installed ANPR number plate recognition cameras on the A67 road through the village, recording all vehicular movements 24 hours a day.

Education
Kirklevington Primary School has about 120 pupils.

The nearest secondary school is Conyers School, about 1.5 miles away in Yarm,  with approximately 1,300 pupils of ages 11 – 18.

Church

St Martin and St Hilary Church is located on Forest Lane and Pump Lane and can be viewed from the A67. It is an English Heritage Grade II* Listed Building that was re-built in 1882 but still has parts dated to the 12th and 13th century.

The Church is mainly associated with St Mary Magdalene Yarm and  All Saints Worsall however has connections to Crathorne, Hutton Rugby and Middleton.

Service times are:

1st Sunday 08:00 - Holy Communion

2nd Sunday 11:00 - Holy Communion

4th Sunday 11:00 - Family Service (Coffee from 10:30)

Morning Prayer takes place every Thursday at 08:00

References

External links

 Riding school
 
 Kirklevington Parish Council

Villages in North Yorkshire
Civil parishes in North Yorkshire
Borough of Stockton-on-Tees
Places in the Tees Valley